Shahrak-e Baraftab-e Shirani (also Romanized as Shahrak-e Barāftāb-e Shīrānī) is a village in Milas Rural District of the Central District of Lordegan County, Chaharmahal and Bakhtiari province, Iran. At the 2006 census, its population was 3,872 in 713 households. The following census in 2011 counted 5,723 people in 1,287 households. The latest census in 2016 showed a population of 6,895 people in 1,677 households; it was the largest village in its rural district.

References 

Lordegan County

Populated places in Chaharmahal and Bakhtiari Province

Populated places in Lordegan County